Ctenomys andersoni, also called Anderson's cujuchi, is a species of tuco-tuco native to Bolivia. It was named after Sydney Anderson, curator of the Department of Mammalogy at the American Museum of Natural History.

References

Endemic fauna of Bolivia
Mammals of Bolivia
Tuco-tucos
Mammals described in 2014